Aphalacrosoma is a genus of flies in the family Dolichopodidae, known from China and Taiwan.

The generic name is derived from the negative prefix "a" and the generic name Phalacrosoma.

Species
There are currently seven species in the genus:
Aphalacrosoma absarista (Wei, 1998)
Aphalacrosoma crypsum (Wei, 1998)
Aphalacrosoma crypsusoideum (Wei, 1998)
Aphalacrosoma hubeiense (Yang, 1998)
Aphalacrosoma modestum (Wei, 1998)
Aphalacrosoma postiseta (Yang & Saigusa, 2001)
Aphalacrosoma taiwanense Zhang, Yang & Masunaga, 2005

Aphalacrosoma sichuanense (Yang & Saigusa, 1999) is a synonym of A. modestus (Wei, 1998).

References

Dolichopodidae genera
Dolichopodinae
Diptera of Asia